Alpha-D-xyloside xylohydrolase (alpha-xylosidase) is an enzyme. This enzyme catalyses the following chemical reaction

 Hydrolysis of terminal, non-reducing alpha-D-xylose residues with release of alpha-D-xylose.

The enzyme catalyses hydrolysis of a terminal, unsubstituted xyloside at the extreme reducing end of a xylogluco-oligosaccharide.

References

External links 
 

EC 3.2.1